John Harvey House may refer to:

John Harvey House (Madisonville, Kentucky), listed on the NRHP in Hopkins County, Kentucky
John Harvey House (Detroit, Michigan), listed on the NRHP in Michigan